Élie N'Zeyi (born 14 June 1997) is a French professional footballer who plays as a midfielder who most recently played for Finn Harps in the League of Ireland Premier Division.

Club career

FK Pohronie
N'Zeyi was featured for Pohronie in winter friendly games and went on to be signed by the Slovak Fortuna Liga club.

N'Zeyi was nominated in late February for a league fixture against AS Trenčín but remained unused. N'Zeyi made his Fortuna Liga debut during an away fixture on 6 March 2021 against Senica. He came on in the 89th minute to replace Martin Adamec and seal the defence. Pohronie was in a narrow 1–0 lead, thanks to a first-half goal by Patrik Blahút. Senica's late pressure was, however, converted into a last-minute equaliser set by a header from Marin Ljubičić. The match ended in said tie.

Finn Harps
On 11th February 2022, N'Zeyi signed for Finn Harps in the League of Ireland Premier Division.

N'Zeyi made his debut for the club on 25 February 2022 in a 0–0 draw away to UCD at the UCD Bowl.

References

External links
 FK Pohronie official club profile 
 
 
 Futbalnet profile 

1997 births
Living people
Sportspeople from Amiens
French footballers
French expatriate footballers
Association football defenders
Amiens SC players
FC Bastia-Borgo players
Évreux FC 27 players
FK Pohronie players
Finn Harps F.C. players
Championnat National 3 players
Championnat National 2 players
Slovak Super Liga players
League of Ireland players
Expatriate footballers in Slovakia
French expatriate sportspeople in Slovakia
Expatriate association footballers in the Republic of Ireland
French expatriate sportspeople in Ireland
Footballers from Hauts-de-France